The  is a museum in Bunkyo-ku district in Tokyo, Japan. Its collection includes historical documents and artifacts, and works of fine art. The museum is located what was formerly the grounds of the Hosokawa clan, near the Shin-Edogawa Garden.

History

The Eisei-Bunko (Eisei Archive) is a collection of important art objects acquired and passed down in the Hosokawa family, a daimyō of 540 thousand-goku (one of the five top daimyōs) in Higo, the present day Kumamoto in Kyushu. The collection has been in existence since the Nanboku-chō Era or the 14th century and is noted for possessing close to 112 thousands objects.

In 1950, the archive was turned into a foundation and a public museum was opened in 1973. Currently the display at the museum is rearranged three times a year at which occasion special events are organized for its members.

Collection

See also

List of National Treasures of Japan (archaeological materials)
List of National Treasures of Japan (crafts-others)
List of National Treasures of Japan (crafts-swords)

External links 
 Homepage (in Japanese)

1973 establishments in Japan
Art museums and galleries in Tokyo
Art museums established in 1973
Higo-Hosokawa clan